Brett a'Court (born 1968) is a New Zealand artist who has lived and painted in Waipu, Northland since 1995, and exhibits regularly in New Zealand, including 11 solo exhibitions between 2002 and 2022. His work can be found in both private and public collections throughout the country.

Early life 
A'Court was born in Christchurch, New Zealand, in 1968, and went to school in the Auckland suburb of Glendowie. He moved to rural, coastal Waipu in 1995 after he married, and worked in ceramics and painted, mostly in oils.

Work 
A'Court's first solo show was called Lectio Divina, and was exhibited at the Letham Gallery, in Ponsonby, Auckland in 2002. It sold well and he left his ceramics job to paint full time. 

A'Court struggled financially for the next four years. He said as a Christian he trusted in God, and channelled his fears and sacrifices into his work. Influenced by Colin McCahon's major works, Renaissance icons and other iconography, a'Court looked at the human figure and beyond to our "spiritual anatomy", he sold some pieces, and created his second solo exhibition, Lingua Sacra, shown at a former church hall in the Parnell Community Centre, Auckland in 2006. The work was noted for its darkness and theme of sexuality colliding with the spiritual. 

Some art galleries and reviewers struggled with the sexual Christian content and complexity of a'Court's 2008 Do Not Fear solo show at the Wallace Gallery, Auckland. Others were more comfortable with the simpler, contemporary Christian mysticism found in his 2008 Beyond the religious image show, also at the Wallace Gallery. In this work a'Court sought to extend the "spiritual truths" he saw uncovered by McCahon. 

A'Court's 2007 oil on canvas, Manu-Kahu, referring to the New Zealand harrier hawk which is connected to the divine by Māori, received praise for combining traditional European-style Christian imagery with Māori indigenous forms and McCahon-style speech bubbles.

In 2018, his first Northland solo show, Sheep, goats and other introduced spirits, at Whangārei's Hangar Gallery, a'Court continued his complex blending of Christian iconography with his life as a contemporary, rural Pākehā New Zealander, depicting the land, colonisation, introduced animals, human anatomy, and the tradition of vanitas.

A'Court was runner-up and winner of the Hugo Charitable Trust Award in Waikato Museum's 2021 National Contemporary Art Award, for Rua Kēnana and Pinepine Te Rika’s descent from Mt Maungapōhatu, which depicts the historical Māori prophet Rua Kēnana and his wife Pinepine Te Rika at the sacred mountain in Te Urewera.

In his 2022 solo show, Shadow of the Epiphany, also at the Hangar Gallery, a'Court continued to explore Christian mysticism and iconography, incorporating his research into the histories of Māori prophets from the Taranaki region's Ringatu and Ratana movements, and others. Many of the works were painted on stretched woollen blankets, which reference British colonisation's "disease, infestation, inequity, technology, trade, but also warmth and comfort".

Personal life 
A'Court has lived at his home studio in Waipu, with his wife Rachel, since they married in 1995. They have two children.

Collections and awards 

 The Whangārei Art Museum collection.
 The James Wallace Arts Trust collection.
 2003 Whakatāne National Ceramics finalist.
 2008 Wallace Art Awards finalist.
 2021 National Contemporary Art Award, Waikato Museum, runner-up and winner of the Hugo Charitable Trust Award.
 2022 National Contemporary Art Award, Waikato Museum, finalist.
 2023 The Molly Morpeth Canaday Award, Arts Whakatāne and Whakatāne District Council, finalist.
 2023 Craigs Aspiring Art Prize, Wanaka, finalist.

Exhibitions 

 2002 Lectio Divina, solo show, Letham Gallery, Ponsonby, Auckland.
 2002–7 showing at Grantham Gallery, Auckland.
 2006 Lingua Sacra solo show, Art-Artz, Parnell Community Centre, Auckland.
 2008 Theology and Art group show, Salisbury House, Dunedin.
 2008 Do Not Fear solo show, Wallace Gallery, Auckland.
 2008 Behind the religious image solo show, Wallace Gallery, Auckland.
 2009 Pathos solo show, Satellite Gallery, Auckland.
 2009 Group show with Ewan McDougall, Thermostat Gallery, Palmerston North.
 2010 Crucifixion group show, Hangar Gallery, Whangārei.
 2010 Group show, Village Arts Gallery, Kohukohu, Hokianga.
 2011 Credo and Quest group show, Whangārei Art Museum.
 2013 Several Artists group show, Art-Artz.
 2013 Fabrications group show, 3rd Space, Auckland.
 2013 Visions of reality solo show, Museum of the Vernacular, Auckland.
 2013 Grottos, Shrines and Sacred spaces solo show, Thermostat Gallery, Palmerston North.
 2015 Exhibition of selected works from the collection, Whangārei Art Museum.
 2015 House of Cards group show, The Incubator, Tauranga.
 2015–16 Flesh and Spirit solo show, TSB Pah Homestead, Wallace Arts Trust, Auckland.
 2017 Printing & Paint Atelier group show, Hangar Gallery, Whangārei.
 2018 Sheep, goats and other introduced spirits, solo show, Hangar Gallery, Whangārei.
 2020 Here & There group exhibition, Megan Dickinson Gallery, Whangārei.
 2020 Mugshots group exhibition, Hangar Art and Framing, Whangārei.
 2022 Huia group exhibition, Zimmerman Art Gallery, Palmerston North.
 2022 Selected works, Boyd-Dunlop Gallery, Napier.
 2022 Shadow of the Epiphany solo show, Hangar Gallery, Whangārei.
 2022 Bones group exhibition, Zimmerman Art Gallery, Palmerston North.
 2022 Redemption Songs small solo show, Scott Lawrie Gallery, Auckland.
 2023 Rabbit group exhibition, Zimmerman Art Gallery, Palmerston North.

See also 

 List of New Zealand artists

References 

1968 births
Living people
Artists from Christchurch
Artists from Auckland
People from Waipu
21st-century New Zealand male artists
20th-century New Zealand painters
20th-century New Zealand male artists
21st-century New Zealand painters